Mystery Fun House was an attraction complex in Orlando, Florida, United States. It was founded with the help of David A. Siegel on March 28, 1976, and operated through February 18, 2001. Located near International Drive on Major Boulevard across from Universal Orlando Resort, the fun house expanded over time to include a laser-tag facility, an arcade, a dinosaur-themed mini golf course, and other attractions.

The former lobby of the Fun House was a Westgate Resorts check-in center. Parts of the building and all of Starbase Omega was destroyed due to Hurricane Irma. The building left of the actual funhouse and all of the mini golf course has been demolished.

The Chambers
The Fun House consisted of 15 areas called "chambers", including a mirror maze, a rolling barrel, crawl-through tunnels, scary jail areas, a moving bridge and a crooked room. In the early days, there was a multiplex movie theater, a hologram machine, a Disco room with a lighted dance floor, and a wall-sized "computer" that could read patrons' handwriting and provide fortunes. There was also a show about three quarters of the way through the Fun House with music, lights, special effects and a video of the Wizard projected on a large screen.

Magic Shop
The Mystery Fun House Magic Shop was run by veteran magician Dan Stapleton . In the early '70s, entertainment producer Jackson Hamiter  trained under Stapleton and his brother, well known for his "Buxxum Bunnies" card tricks.

Starbase Omega
Starbase Omega was a laser tag facility. Each player was equipped with a reflective target badge, a battery belt pack, and a "laser" gun. To get to Starbase Omega, patrons sat on a transporter that simulated a ride to the planet. Once on the planet—a large, dark room with extra-bouncy carpets and a hovering spaceship—players shot light beams at other players, trying to hit their reflective badges.

Mystery Mini Golf / Jurassic Putt
Originally called Mystery Mini Golf, Jurassic Putt was an 18-hole, dinosaur-themed miniature golf course that included a dark building for one of the holes.

Mystery Fun House Pizza and show
In MFH's later days, a pizza parlor was added that featured an animatronic show in the style of ShowBiz Pizza and Chuck E. Cheese's.

Movies
Two movies were filmed at the Mystery Fun House: the birthday scene of Parenthood (1989), and most of Night Terror (2002).

External links
BigFloridaCountry- Information by Scott Jensen
MFH on BigFloridaCountry- Pictures and Information
MFH on Facebook- Discussion, Images, and much Information

Tourist attractions in Orlando, Florida
Defunct amusement parks in Florida
Buildings and structures in Orlando, Florida
Siegel family
1976 establishments in Florida
2001 disestablishments in Florida